The lesser ʻakialoa (Akialoa obscura) was a species of finch in the family Fringillidae. It was endemic to the island of Hawaii. It became extinct due to habitat loss.  It disappeared at around the same time as its Oahu cousin.

Description
 
It was a yellowish bird with a two-inch-long thin whitish-yellow bill. It had small olive green wings which it used to flit from tree to tree to look for insects like beetles and caterpillars.

Behavior
It was seen gleaning the trees in search of insects. The bill of the akialoa was also designed for more than bug extraction.  The akialoa also fed on nectar in the flowers of lobeliads and o’hia blossoms. Its long bill could easily fit into petals of long flowers and took pollen from flower to flower on its forehead. It was collected at several places. It was once thought to be the same species as the Maui and Oahu form, but when specimens were compared all together the scientist saw that all three were different species.

Extinction
With the loss of the trees and the flowers, the bird had no shelter or food and disappeared in 1940.

References

External links
 3D view of specimens RMNH 110.013 and RMNH 110.014 at Naturalis, Leiden (requires QuickTime browser plugin)

Lesser akialoa
Hawaiian honeycreepers
Extinct birds of Hawaii
Endemic birds of Hawaii
Lesser akialoa
Lesser akialoa
Bird extinctions since 1500
Taxonomy articles created by Polbot